André Fonseca Amaro (born 13 August 2002) is a Portuguese football player who plays as a defensive midfielder for Vitória de Guimarães in the Primeira Liga.

Football career
Born in Coimbra, Amaro played for Associação Naval 1º de Maio and hometown club Académica de Coimbra before joining Vitória de Guimarães. After playing for the reserve team in the third tier, he made his first-team debut on 21 December 2020 as an 85th-minute substitute for Pepelu in a 4–0 Primeira Liga win at C.D. Santa Clara. He totalled 12 appearances over the season, scoring once to open a 2–0 derby win at home to Moreirense F.C. on 30 April. A month later, his contract was updated from one expiring in 2023 with a buyout clause of €30 million, to one lasting until 2025 with the clause set at €50 million.

References

External links
 
 Fora de Jogo Profile

2002 births
Living people
Sportspeople from Coimbra
Portuguese footballers
Vitória S.C. players
Vitória S.C. B players
Primeira Liga players
Association football defenders
Association football midfielders